A Pistol for Ringo is a 1965 Spaghetti Western, a joint Italian and Spanish production. Originally written and directed by Duccio Tessari, the film's success led to a sequel, The Return of Ringo, later that year.

The film stars Giuliano Gemma (billed as 'Montgomery Wood') alongside Fernando Sancho, Nieves Navarro, George Martin, Antonio Casas, José Manuel Martín and Hally Hammond.

Plot
The film opens as the film's protagonist, a gunfighter known as "Angel Face" or Ringo, kills four men in a gunfight. He is then arrested for manslaughter and locked up in the city jail where he awaits trial.

Meanwhile, Major Clyde and his daughter Ruby are celebrating Christmas with several guests on their ranch. They are interrupted by a bandit gang who storm the hacienda and take them hostage. The bandits have narrowly escaped from a bank robbery in which their leader Sancho has been wounded. In a desperate attempt to deter their pursuers, they decide to hold the family hostage threatening to execute two a day until they are allowed to go free.

The house is surrounded by a posse led by the town sheriff, however he fears for the safety of the hostages, including his fiancée Ruby, if he attempts to free the hostage by force. He decides to enlist the aid of Ringo, who agrees to infiltrate the gang and free the hostages in exchange for his freedom and a percentage of the stolen money.

He manages to successfully join up with the gang, posing as a fellow outlaw on the run, however Ringo's plans quickly become complicated as Sancho begins ordering the execution of hostages as well as the tension within the house as Delores, Sancho's woman, encourages Major Clyde's romantic feelings while one of Sancho's men begins making advances towards Major Clyde's daughter, Ruby. He at first seems to double-cross the sheriff, however he succeeds in deceiving Sancho and allows the sheriff and his posse to storm the hacienda freeing the hostages and defeating Sancho and his bandits.

Cast
 Montgomery Wood as Ringo; a gunfighter who agrees to rescue a family which has been taken hostage by a Mexican bandit. His motives are often self-serving and opportunistic, having agreed in exchange for his release from prison.
 George Martin as Sheriff Ben; the local sheriff, he arranges Ringo's release in exchange for his help in rescuing the hostages. One of the hostages is Ruby, his fiancée and the daughter of the captive land baron.
 Fernando Sancho as Sancho; a Mexican bandit who has taken a local land baron's family hostage in a desperate attempt to escape from a failed bank robbery.
 Nieves Navarro as Delores; the girlfriend of Sancho. She is a seductive yet manipulative woman who manages to charm the land baron.
 Antonio Casas as Major Clyde; the land baron whose family has been taken hostage by the bandits. He later becomes romantically involved with Delores, the girlfriend of the bandit leader.
 Hally Hammond as Miss Ruby; the daughter of Major Clyde, she is the fiancée of the town sheriff however she soon develops feelings for Ringo.
 José Manuel Martin as Pedro; one of bandits and lieutenant to Sancho.
 Pajarito as Timoteo/Tim
Pablito Alonso as Chico
Paco Sanz as Colonel
 Juan Casalilla as Mr. Jenkinson, bank director
Nazzareno Zamperla as Sancho henchman
 José Halufi as Sancho henchman
 Duccio Tessari as Felipe, Sancho henchman
 Franco Pesce as Storekeeper
 Alfonso Alcantara as Deputy Sheriff
 Francisco Gabarre as Townsman
 Miguel Pedregosa as Sancho Gang Member
 Carlos Ronda as Storekeeper
 Marc Smith as Ringo Angel Face
 Juan Torres as Henry, Bank Clerk

Production

Encouraged by the success of Sergio Leone's A Fistful of Dollars the previous year, which he had helped write, Duccio Tessari decided to produce his own western. A well-known screenwriter of horror and "sword-and-sandal" films, he had previously worked with several Spaghetti Western directors, most notably "the two Sergios", as the co-writer of Sergio Leone's The Colossus of Rhodes (1961) and Sergio Corbucci's Romulus and Remus (1961).

He had originally developed the story and co-wrote the script with Alfonso Balcázar. There is more humorous theme, and at times uses slapstick comedy, compared to usual Spaghetti Westerns. The interaction between actors was more relaxed to fully develop the effect of comedic sequences. The main character, loosely based on gunfighter Johnny Ringo, was portrayed as the antithesis of Leone's Man with No Name character — talkative, well dressed, clean-shaven and preferring milk to whiskey.

Casting
The cast, both leading and supporting roles, were primarily made up of Italian and Spanish actors including Montgomery Wood and Hally Hammond, born Giuliano Gemma and Lorella De Luca respectively. This was also the spaghetti western film debut of Giuliano Gemma, previously having a minor role in Tessari's Sons of Thunder, and would go on to star in a number of other Spaghetti Westerns including One Silver Dollar (1965) and Adios, Gringo (1965). Shortly after the film was released, Gemma compared his role as Ringo to his character in Sons of Thunder commenting "For this film, I acted a character who was a little like the one I had played in "Sons of Thunder". Quite simply, I was in a different costume and a different setting."

Filming
Shot on location in Almeria, Spain, most of the filming took place during early 1965 prior to its premiere in Italy and Spain later that year.

Reaction
A Pistol for Ringo was a huge success on the domestic market following its release in Italy on May 12 and in Spain on December 9, 1965, grossing US$1,940,000 in Italy and making over 17,379,404 ₧ (US$104,450) in Spain. The film was shown across Western Europe during early 1966; although it would not appear in Finland and Sweden until early the next year. In Scandinavia, the film generally received an "over 16" rating in  Norway (16), Finland (K-16) and Sweden (15 År) while having a significantly higher rating in West Germany (FSK 18) and the United Kingdom (U).

It also did well in the United States where it premiered in New York City on November 2, 1966. The film particularly stood out from its American counterparts, mostly consisting of lower quality b-movies. Its theme, composed by Ennio Morricone and performed by Maurizio Graf, was a more traditional American western ballad compared to his previous work on Spaghetti Westerns and proved popular rising to number one on the Italian charts.

There were some scenes cut in the English-language version to make it more focused on its action and dramatic elements. One scene which was cut includes Ringo removing the bullet from Sancho's shoulder. This specific scene was originally used to explain why Filipe, one of Sancho's henchmen wears a bandage on his hand (Ringo had previously broke his hand with a goblet). Other changes included removing the Christmas carolers and the opening farce duel as well as dialogue and name changes. One example was the during the final scene when Major Clyde throws a flintlock pistol to Ringo. In the English version, Major Clyde claims his grandfather used the pistol at the Battle of Waterloo, however in the original version he states the pistol was used at the Battle of Austerlitz. Austerlitz was used rather than the French defeat at Waterloo to please European audiences. The film retained its original title for the most part, however it was also re-titled as Ballad of Death Valley in the U.S. and Ringo: The Killer elsewhere.

Sequels
The success of A Pistol for Ringo inspired numerous sequels, most notably $10,000 for Ringo (1965), Ringo and Gringo Against All (1966) and Two R-R-Ringos from Texas (1967). A musical comedy, A Woman for Ringo (1966), was also released and starred Sean Flynn and the Bayona Twins, Pili and Mili Bayona. However, the film received extremely poor reviews, as would most other western-themed musicals. Other such sequels included Ringo and His Golden Pistol (1966), Ringo of Nebraska (1966) and Ringo the Face of Revenge (1967). The Texican (1966) was retitled Ringo il Texano in Italy.

References

External links
 
 
 
 A Pistol for Ringo Trailer at YouTube
 A Pistol for Ringo at the Spaghetti Western Database

1965 films
Spanish Western (genre) films
Italian Western (genre) films
Spaghetti Western films
1960s Italian-language films
1965 Western (genre) films
Films directed by Duccio Tessari
Films scored by Ennio Morricone
Italian Christmas films
Spanish Christmas films
Films shot in Almería
1960s Italian films